Hokkaido:
 Hokkaido - island in Japan
 Hokkaido - prefecture in Japan
 Hokkaido - dog
 Hokkaido - pony